The Mind the Paint Girl is a 1919 American silent romantic drama film directed by Wilfrid North based upon the play of the same name by Arthur Wing Pinero and starring Anita Stewart. Stewart produced along with the Vitagraph Company and released through First National Exhibitors.

Cast
Anita Stewart as Lily Upjohn / Lily Parradell
Conway Tearle as Capt. Nicholas Jeyes
Vernon Steele as Lord Francombe (credited as Victor Steele)
Templar Saxe as Lal Roper
Arthur Donaldson as Vincent Bland
Robert Lee Keeling as Col. The Hon. Arthur Stidulph
Virginia Norden as Mrs. Arthur Stidulph
Hattie Delaro as Mrs. Upjohn
George Stewart as Bob
Gladys Valerie as Jimmie Birch

Preservation
With no listings of The Mind the Paint Girl in any film archives, it is considered to be a lost film.

References

External links

1919 films
American silent feature films
Lost American films
American black-and-white films
Films directed by Wilfrid North
American romantic drama films
1919 romantic drama films
1910s American films
Silent romantic drama films
Silent American drama films
1919 lost films
Lost romantic drama films
1910s English-language films